Guangzhou Nanfang International School (GNIS) is an international school on the property of the South Industrial Park, in , Tianhe District, Guangzhou. The school serves students ages 2.5 to 17, from early childhood to secondary school.

The school admits non-Mainland Chinese foreign students. Only Mainland Chinese students who have permanent residency in a country other than Mainland China are eligible to attend.

History 
The school opened in 2003 as the Guangzhou Nanhu International School "Guangzhou South Lake International School").

Originally it was located in Baiyun District. In 2008 it moved into a facility in central Tianhe, located in The Greenery.

Notes

References

External links 
 Guangzhou Nanfang International School official website

International schools in Guangzhou
Tianhe District